Air Poland Sp. z o.o. (formerly Air Italy Polska Sp. z o.o.) was a charter airline founded in 2007 and was based in Warsaw, Poland. A former subsidiary of Air Italy, it operated charter flights on behalf of Polish tour operators to a broad range of destinations across the Mediterranean region, the Caribbean and beach resorts in Thailand and India. Most flights departed from either Warsaw Frederic Chopin Airport,  Katowice International Airport or Poznań-Ławica Airport.

Air Poland ceased all operations and filed for bankruptcy in April 2012.

History
In April 2011 Air Italy Polska rebranded to Air Poland. It was not a part of the Air Italy Group anymore. The last owners were Mariusz Szpikowski and Dariusz Paszke.

Destinations

Air Poland operated charter flights to leisure destinations in the following countries:

Summer schedule:
 Turkey
 Greece
 Egypt
 Tunisia
 Spain
 Italy
 Portugal
 Morocco
Winter schedule:
 Caribbean Islands
 Southeast Asia
 South America

In 2011 FlyCentralEurope announced in-cooperation with Air Italy and Hamilton (ON) airport, it will be offering new service from Hamilton to Budapest, Kraków and Prague, on board Air Italy's Boeing 767-200ER aircraft.  In addition, the tour operator also chartered Air Italy for 2 weekly Chicago – Kraków service. The Boeing 767-200ER would have been transferred to Air Italy Polska. These flights never took off and were cancelled as of 19 May 2011.

Fleet
As of February 2012, the Air Poland fleet consisted of the following aircraft with an average age of 5.8 years:

References

External links

Official website
Official website 

Defunct airlines of Poland
Airlines established in 2007
Airlines disestablished in 2012
Defunct charter airlines
2012 disestablishments in Poland
Polish companies established in 2007